Mnemoses is a genus of moths of the family Yponomeutidae.

Species
Mnemoses farquharsoni - Durrant, 1921 

Yponomeutidae